Mahatma Gandhi Institute may refer to:

 Mahatma Gandhi Institute of Education for Peace and Sustainable Development (New Delhi, India)
 Mahatma Gandhi Institute of Medical Sciences (Sevagram, Maharashtra, India)
 Mahatma Gandhi Institute for Rural Industrialization (Wardha, Maharashtra, India) 
 Mahatma Gandhi Institute of Technology (Gandipet, Hyderabad, Telangana, India)
 Mahatma Gandhi Institute (Mauritius)